were a Danish band founded in 1995 mainly by Katrine Stochholm and Henriette Sennenvaldt.

 (Danish for "Below the City") were known for producing their own unorthodox interpretation of rock. They rarely use guitars. Instead their soundscape is dominated by piano, cello, violin, electrically distorted saw, organ, drums and percussion. They perform a somewhat different vein of rock (or pop) spiced up with jazzy, folky and classical elements. An important part of the music are also the poetic Danish lyrics which are presented to the listener by female vocals.

The 1999 debut album  impressed music critics, who applauded the band for creating their own style and tone. The second album  (2002) was equally praised and has grown to become a hallmark for the band and helped reach a wider audience in Denmark and elsewhere. In 2004 it was re-released outside Denmark.

In 2004 the band remixed Rammstein's 2004 Single Ohne Dich.

In 2006 the band released their album  to rave reviews.

Far from being a mainstream act  has nevertheless attracted a growing devoted fanbase following the release of their two albums and intense live shows.

's influences are very diverse. Lead singer Henriette Sennenvaldt has been quoted as saying she was inspired by traffic. And if  would be said to have a theme it would probably be water and harbours. They rarely cite any direct musical influences, but on occasion band members have expressed their fondness for artists such as Stina Nordenstam, Björk, Tori Amos, Sigur Rós, Tom Waits, Mogwai, Mark Hollis and Talk Talk.

In 2010 the band released their fourth album, Alt Er Tabt, which translates to "all is lost." The album was released on April 6 by Paper Bag Records.

Members
Henriette Sennenvaldt – vocals, lyricist
Rasmus Kjær Larsen – pianos
Nils Gröndahl – violin, saw, lapsteel, a variety of guitar pedals
Morten Larsen – drums
Sara Saxild – bass
Anders Stochholm – percussion, accordion, harmonica, guitar
Stine Sørensen – drums, percussion
Morten Svenstrup – cello

Former members
Katrine Stochholm – composer, melodica, backing vocals, piano, lyricist
Myrtha Wolf – cello
Thorbjørn Krogshede – composer, piano, bass clarinet

Discography

Albums
, 1999
Remix, 2001
, 2002
, soundtrack album, 2003
, 2006
, 2010

EPs
Puma, 1997
Live at Haldern Pop, 2004
Siamesisk, 2008
Protokol, 2013

Singles
"", 1998

References

External links
 Official Website
 Official MySpace Profile
Under Byen profile from Exclaim! magazine
 Fan site
 Photos from Knitting Factory show, 2007
 Animation with Under Byen soundtrack
  Acoustic Session with 'They Shoot Music - Don't They'

Danish post-rock groups
Musical groups established in 1995
Paper Bag Records artists